Ethel Browning may refer to:
 Ethel Browning (toxicologist) (1891–1969), British toxicologist
 Ethel Browning (actress) ( 1876–1965), American actress